Herbert Mather (1840–1916) was an Anglican bishop in the last decades of the 19th century and the first part of the 20th.

Mather was educated at St Andrew's University and Trinity College, Cambridge and ordained in 1867. He began his ordained ministry as vice-principal and then the principal of Carmarthen Training College. He then became chaplain to the Bishop of Newfoundland and incumbent of the cathedral. After this he was the rector of All Saints' Huntingdon and rural dean of Gartree. From 1891 to 1897 he was Provost of St Andrew's Cathedral, Inverness when he was ordained to the episcopate as the 4th Bishop of Antigua. Returning to England he was an assistant bishop in the Diocese of Hereford until his retirement in 1912.

References

1865 births
Alumni of Trinity College, Cambridge
Provosts of Inverness Cathedral
20th-century Anglican bishops in the Caribbean
Anglican bishops of Antigua
1916 deaths